Sebastian Schonlau (born 5 August 1994) is a German professional footballer who plays as a defender or midfielder for and captains 2. Bundesliga club Hamburger SV.

References

External links
 

1994 births
Living people
Association football midfielders
German footballers
SC Verl players
SC Paderborn 07 players
Hamburger SV players
Bundesliga players
2. Bundesliga players
3. Liga players